

Comparison Table

Agreements
Argentina was the first Latin American country to formalize relations with the EU under a 3rd generation cooperation agreement. The Framework Trade and Economic Co-operation Agreement between the EU and Argentina entered into force in 1990 and includes two recurrent principles of their cooperation: the strengthening of democracy and human rights, as well as regional integration. An EU-Argentina Joint Commission has also been established. A number of sectoral agreements were established in the 1990s. The main focuses of cooperation are education and training; economic competitiveness; capacity‑building in the public and academic sectors.

Argentina is part of the EU's negotiating with the regional bloc Mercosur for a free trade agreement which will form the back bone of EU-Latin American relations. However, during the 2000s and early 2010s the Kirchner administration developed a protectionist policy and stalled negotiations for a free trade agreement. Mauricio Macri restarted the process in his first months as president.

In 2016, the French government has asked to delay negotiations for a free trade agreement to carry an impact study, which was supported by several European countries. Others like Spain and Italy have asked for immediate negotiations.

Trade

The EU is Argentina's second largest export market (after Brazil). Argentina's exports to the EU are mainly agricultural and other primary goods. The EU exports less goods to Argentina in return (giving the EU a deficit of €3.4 billion) but has a surplus in services of €0.4 billion. The EU is also Argentina's biggest foreign investor, accounting for half of Argentina's foreign direct investment (FDI).

Argentina's foreign relations with EU member states

  Austria
  Belgium
  Bulgaria
  Croatia
  Cyprus
  Czech Republic
  Denmark
  Estonia
  Finland
  France
  Germany
  Greece
  Hungary
  Ireland
  Italy
  Latvia
  Lithuania
  Luxembourg
  Malta
  Netherlands
  Poland
  Portugal
  Romania
  Slovakia
  Slovenia
  Spain
  Sweden

See also 
 Foreign relations of Argentina 
 Foreign relations of the European Union

References

External links
 EU delegation to Argentina (English)

 
European Union
Third-country relations of the European Union